Russia participated in the Eurovision Song Contest 2021 in Rotterdam, the Netherlands. The Russian broadcaster Channel One Russia (C1R) organised a national selection to determine the Russian representative. , this was Russia's final entry at the contest, before the country was excluded the following year.

Background

Prior to the 2021 contest, Russia had participated in the Eurovision Song Contest 22 times since its first entry in 1994. Russia had won the contest on one occasion in 2008 with the song "Believe" performed by Dima Bilan. In , Russia finished third with the song "You Are the Only One" performed by Sergey Lazarev, who would later return to represent his country again in 2019 with the song "Scream", also finishing in third place. In 2020, the band Little Big was set to represent Russia with the song "" before the contest's cancellation.

Before Eurovision

Early selection plans 
On 8 May 2020, during an episode of Eurovisioncalls with Little Big as guests, Little Big's members Ilya Prusikin and Sonya Tayurskaya announced that they would submit several songs to Channel One and would be happy to be invited to participate again, however C1R decided to choose a new representative via a national final and on 2 March 2021, it was announced that a national final would be held with several, at that time, unknown candidates. On 3 March 2021, tabloid super.ru leaked a shortlist of candidates for the Russian national final and stated in an article with the list of candidates that producer Yana Rudkovskaya criticized the idea with a new selection initiated by Channel One, saying that it would be worthwhile to send Little Big again, and that there is still a chance that Little Big will represent Russia.

National final 

The Russian national final took place on 8 March 2021 at the Mosfilm Studios in Moscow and hosted by Yana Churikova. Three artists and songs participated and the winner was selected through a public televote. The show was broadcast Channel One as well as online via the broadcaster's website 1tv.ru. The show had a market share of 12.5%, making it the fifth most popular show of the evening and the fourteenth most popular show of the week.

Competing artists
For the contest, selection committee of Channel One shortlisted nine artists, and asked them to submit the unreleased songs for consideration. Committee then listened to the received submissions and selected 3 entries for the national final. Selected artists and the competing entries for the contest were officially presented on the evening of the selection itself, however, the names of participants were leaked via Instagram two hours before the show. Among the competing artists were Maria Zaytseva from #2Mashi (2005 and 2008 Russian national selection participant as part of A-Sortie) and Victoria Zhuk from Therr Maitz (2010 Russian national selection participant as part of Los Devchatos).

Final
The final took place on 8 March 2021. Three entries competed and the winner, "Russian Woman" performed by Manizha, was selected exclusively through a public televote. In addition to the performances of the competing entries, 2020 Russian Eurovision entrants Little Big performed "", 1995 Russian Eurovision entrant Philipp Kirkorov performed a revamped version of "", 2015 Russian Eurovision entrant Polina Gagarina performed the Russian version of "A Million Voices", and 2008 Eurovision winner for Russia Dima Bilan performed "Believe" as guests.

At Eurovision 
According to Eurovision rules, all nations with the exceptions of the host country and the "Big Five" (France, Germany, Italy, Spain and the United Kingdom) are required to qualify from one of two semi-finals in order to compete in the final; the top ten countries from each semi-final progress to the final. The European Broadcasting Union (EBU) split up the competing countries into six different pots based on voting patterns from previous contests, with countries with favourable voting histories put into the same pot. For the 2021 contest, the semi-final allocation draw held for 2020 which was held on 28 January 2020, will be used. Russia was placed into the first semi-final, which was held on 18 May 2021, and was scheduled to perform in the first half of the show.

Once all the competing songs for the 2021 contest had been released, the running order for the semi-finals was decided by the shows' producers rather than through another draw, so that similar songs were not placed next to each other. Russia was set to perform in position 3, following the entry from Slovenia and preceding the entry from Sweden.

Russia performed 5th in the grand final on 22 May 2021, following Belgium and preceding Malta. At the close of voting it finished on 9th place, receiving 204 points: 100 points from televoting and 104 points from juries.

Voting 
Voting during the three shows involved each country awarding two sets of points from 1-8, 10 and 12: one from their professional jury and the other from televoting. Each nation's jury consisted of five music industry professionals who are citizens of the country they represent, with a diversity in gender and age represented. The judges assess each entry based on the performances during the second Dress Rehearsal of each show, which takes place the night before each live show, against a set of criteria including: vocal capacity; the stage performance; the song's composition and originality; and the overall impression by the act. Jury members may only take part in panel once every three years, and are obliged to confirm that they are not connected to any of the participating acts in a way that would impact their ability to vote impartially. Jury members should also vote independently, with no discussion of their vote permitted with other jury members. The exact composition of the professional jury, and the results of each country's jury and televoting were released after the grand final; the individual results from each jury member were also released in an anonymised form.

Points awarded to Russia

Points awarded by Russia

Detailed voting results 
The following members comprised the Russian jury:
 Dina Garipova
 
 Leonid Rudenko
 
 Julia Volkova

References

2021
Countries in the Eurovision Song Contest 2021
Eurovision